Daria Fantoni (born 24 January 1942) is an Italian equestrian. She competed at the 1988 Summer Olympics, the 1992 Summer Olympics and the 1996 Summer Olympics.

References

External links
 

1942 births
Living people
Italian female equestrians
Italian dressage riders
Olympic equestrians of Italy
Equestrians at the 1988 Summer Olympics
Equestrians at the 1992 Summer Olympics
Equestrians at the 1996 Summer Olympics
Sportspeople from Turin
20th-century Italian women
21st-century Italian women